Gerry Mays (18 July 1921 – 20 March 2006) was a Scottish football player and manager. He played for Hibernian, St Johnstone, Dunfermline Athletic and Kilmarnock, and then managed Ayr United. Mays appeared for Kilmarnock in the 1957 Scottish Cup Final and 1952 Scottish League Cup Final, and for Dunfermline in the 1949–50 Scottish League Cup Final.

External links 
 Gerald Mayes, www.ihibs.co.uk
 

1921 births
2006 deaths
Sportspeople from Wishaw
Scottish footballers
Association football inside forwards
Hibernian F.C. players
St Johnstone F.C. players
Dunfermline Athletic F.C. players
Kilmarnock F.C. players
Scottish Football League players
Scottish football managers
Ayr United F.C. managers
Scottish Football League managers
Footballers from North Lanarkshire